"Desperados Waiting for a Train" is a song written by Guy Clark and originally recorded by Jerry Jeff Walker for his 1973 album Viva Terlingua. It subsequently appeared on Rita Coolidge's 1974 album Fall into Spring, David Allan Coe's third album, The Mysterious Rhinestone Cowboy (1974), Tom Rush's album Ladies Love Outlaws the same year, before Clark's own rendition was released on his first LP, 1975's Old No. 1. Clark has stated that the song is about his grandmother's boyfriend named Jack who was a grandfather figure to him.

The song was also covered by Slim Pickens in 1981 on his self-titled album (Picc-A-Dilly PIC-3484).

Also Mallard https://en.wikipedia.org/wiki/Mallard_(album)

The American country music group the Highwaymen released it as a single in September 1985.  It was the second single from the album Highwayman.  The song reached #15 on the Billboard Hot Country Singles & Tracks chart.

Nanci Griffith recorded it for her 1998 album Other Voices Too (A Trip Back to Bountiful), accompanied by Clark, Jerry Jeff Walker, Steve Earle, Rodney Crowell, Jimmie Dale Gilmore, and  Eric Taylor.

Jason Isbell covered the song for Guy Clark's induction into the 2015 Austin City Limits hall of fame ceremony.

Members of the Western Writers of America chose it as one of the Top 100 Western songs of all time.

Chart performance

References

1973 songs
1985 singles
Jerry Jeff Walker songs
Rita Coolidge songs
David Allan Coe songs
The Highwaymen (country supergroup) songs
Johnny Cash songs
Waylon Jennings songs
Kris Kristofferson songs
Willie Nelson songs
Songs written by Guy Clark
Song recordings produced by Chips Moman
Columbia Records singles
Vocal collaborations
Songs about trains